Diana Hardcastle Wilkinson is an English actress who has appeared largely in television roles.

Career
Hardcastle has appeared in episodes of Midsomer Murders, Inspector Lynley and Taggart. She played recurring roles in the series First Among Equals and Fortunes of War.

In 2011, Hardcastle and actor Tom Wilkinson, her husband, portrayed real life husband and wife Joe and Rose Kennedy in the mini series The Kennedys.

In 2012, she had a supporting role in the film The Best Exotic Marigold Hotel, in which her husband starred (their characters did not interact), and a returning role in the 2015 sequel The Second Best Exotic Marigold Hotel. Wilkinson and Hardcastle again played husband and wife in Good People (2014) and played brother-in-law and sister-in-law in the television series Belgravia (2020).

Filmography

Film

Television

Personal life
Hardcastle is married to English actor Tom Wilkinson. They have two children, Alice born in 1988 and Molly born in 1991.

References

External links

British television actresses
Living people
1949 births
Best Supporting Actress in a Television Film or Miniseries Canadian Screen Award winners